The Act of Free Choice was a controversial plebiscite held between 14 July and 2 August 1969 in which 1,025 people selected by the Indonesian military in Western New Guinea voted unanimously in favor of Indonesian control.

The event was mentioned by the United Nations in General Assembly resolution 2504 (XXIV) without giving an opinion whether it complied with the authorizing New York Agreement, and without giving an opinion whether it was an act of "self-determination" as referred to and described in United Nations General Assembly resolutions 1514 and 1541 (XV) respectively. The event is sometimes disparagingly referred to as the "Act of No Choice" because of its controversial process.

Background
The referendum and its conduct had been specified in the New York Agreement; Article 17 of which in part says:
"Indonesia will invite the Secretary-General to appoint a Representative who" ... "will carry out Secretary-General's responsibilities to advise, assist, and participate in arrangements which are the responsibility of Indonesia for the act of free choice. The Secretary-General will, at the proper time, appoint the United Nations Representative in order that he and his staff may assume their duties in the territory one year prior to the self-determination." ... "The United Nations Representative and his staff will have the same freedom of movement as provided for the personnel referred to in Article XVI".

The agreement continues with Article 18:
Article XVIII
Indonesia will make arrangements, with the assistance and participation of the United Nations Representative and his staff, to give the people of the territory, the opportunity to exercise freedom of choice. Such arrangements will include:
 a. Consultation (musyawarah) with the representative councils on procedures and methods to be followed for ascertaining the freely expressed will of the population.
 b. The determination of the actual date of the exercise of free choice within the period established by the present Agreement.
 c. Formulations of the questions in such a way as to permit the inhabitants to decide (a) whether they wish to remain with Indonesia; or (b) whether they wish to sever ties with Indonesia.
 d. The eligibility of all adults, male and female, not foreign nationals to participate in the act of self-determination to be carried out in accordance with international practice, who are resident at the time of the signing of the present Agreement, including those residents who departed after 1945 and who returned to the territory to resume residence after the termination of the Netherlands administration.

Process
Under Article 17 of the New York Agreement, the plebiscite was not to occur until one year after the arrival of U.N. representative Fernando Ortiz-Sanz (the Bolivian ambassador to the United Nations) in the territory on 22 August 1968.

The New York Agreement specified that all men and women in Papua who were not foreign nationals had the right to vote in the Act. General Sarwo Edhi Wibowo instead selected 1,025 Melanesian men and women  out of an estimated population of 800,000 as the Western New Guinea representatives for the vote, which was conducted across eight regencies over three weeks.

Electors were asked to vote by raising their hands or reading from prepared scripts, in a display for United Nations observers. They voted publicly and unanimously in favour of Indonesian control. 

According to Hugh Lunn, a journalist from Reuters, men who were selected for the vote were coerced into voting against independence with threats of violence against their persons and their families. Contemporary diplomatic cables showed American diplomats suspecting that Indonesia could not have won a fair vote, and also suspecting that the vote was not implemented freely, but the diplomats saw the event as a "foregone conclusion" and "marginal to U.S. interests". Ortiz-Sanz wrote in his report that "an act of free choice has taken place in accordance with Indonesian practice”, but not confirming that it was in accordance with international practice as the Act of Free Choice had required.

The United Nations took note of the results with General Assembly Resolution 2504.

Aftermath

Demands for a revote
The Act of Free Choice has sometimes been criticized as the "act of no choice", and many independence activists continuously protest for a fresh referendum for every single Papuan. After the fall of Suharto in 1998, celebrity Archbishop Desmond Tutu and some American and European parliamentarians requested United Nations Secretary Kofi Annan to review the United Nations' role in the vote and the validity of the Act of Free Choice. There have been calls for the United Nations to conduct its own referendum, with as broad an electorate as critics say the New York Agreement obliged but the Act of Free Choice did not fulfill. Those calling for a vote also point to the 30 year license which Indonesia sold to Freeport-McMoRan for Papuan mining rights in 1967, and to the Indonesian military's response to the East Timor referendum as support to discredit the 1969 Act of Free Choice. The Indonesian government's position is that the United Nations' noting of the results validates it.

A new referendum is supported by many international organisations including the Free West Papua Campaign which works with West Papuans to provide all West Papuans with self-determination and full independence from Indonesian rule.

The Federal Republic of West Papua, formed on 19 October 2011 at the Third West Papuan People's Congress, has declared the New York Agreement and The Act of Free Choice "null and invalid", and seeks recognition by the United Nations as an independent nation according to international and customary law.

Monuments
Monuments commemorating the event is built in Jayapura and Merauke, both in Papua. They were inaugurated by President Suharto on 16 and 17 September 1969, respectively.

See also
West New Guinea dispute
Papua conflict

Bibliography
The United Nations and the Indonesian Takeover of West Papua, 1962–1969: Anatomy of a Betrayal by John Saltford (2002)  (pdf 3.4 MB)
Drooglever, Pieter J.: Een Daad van Vrije Keuze: De Papoea's van Westelijke Nieuw-Guinea en de grenzen van het zelfbeschikkingsrecht. Uitgeverij Boom, Amsterdam, 2005.  (Summary)

References

New Order (Indonesia)
Western New Guinea
1969 in law
Sovereignty referendums
1969
West Papua